This is a list of episodes from the Discovery Channel series, Storm Chasers.

Series overview
{| class="wikitable"
|-
! colspan="2"|Season
! Episodes
! Season premiere
! Season finale
|-
|  style="background:darkred; height:5px;"|
| style="text-align:center;"|[[List of Storm Chasers episodes#Season 1 (2007)|1]]
| style="text-align:center;"| 4
| style="text-align:center;"| October 17, 2007
| style="text-align:center;"| November 7, 2007
|-
|  style="background:darkgreen; height:5px;"|
| style="text-align:center;"|[[List of Storm Chasers episodes#Season 2 (2008)|2]]
| style="text-align:center;"| 8
| style="text-align:center;"| October 19, 2008
| style="text-align:center;"| December 7, 2008
|-
|  style="background:darkblue; height:5px;"|
| style="text-align:center;"|[[List of Storm Chasers episodes#Season 3 (2009)|3]]
| style="text-align:center;"| 8
| style="text-align:center;"| October 18, 2009
| style="text-align:center;"| November 29, 2009
|-
|  style="background:purple; height:5px;"|
| style="text-align:center;"|[[List of Storm Chasers episodes#Season 4 (2010)|4]]
| style="text-align:center;"| 8
| style="text-align:center;"| October 13, 2010
| style="text-align:center;"| December 1, 2010
|-
|  style="background:yellow; height:5px;"|
| style="text-align:center;"|[[List of Storm Chasers episodes#Season 5 (2011)|5]]
| style="text-align:center;"| 8
| style="text-align:center;"| September 25, 2011
| style="text-align:center;"| November 10, 2011
|}

Episodes

Season 1 (2007)
During the 2007 season, which consisted of 4 episodes, Josh Wurman and Sean Casey's team used a fleet of three vehicles: the Tornado Intercept Vehicle (or TIV), the Scout (a modified 1993 Nissan Pathfinder), and a Doppler on Wheels (or DOW). Team members for the 2007 season included Herb Stein (DOW driver), Mara McFalls (scout driver/journalist), Justin Walker (scout navigator/meteorologist), Danny Cheresnick (DOW navigator/meteorologist), and Karen Kosiba (DOW navigator/meteorologist).

Season 2 (2008)
For the 2008 season, which consisted of eight episodes, Wurman and Casey's team and its vehicles were expanded and upgraded as follows: 1) the DOW 3 was replaced by the new DOW6 (based around an International 7500 truck) with improved speed, power and range; 2) the original TIV was augmented by the new TIV2 (both versions are still used in the field); and 3) two new vehicles, PROBE 1 and PROBE 2 (modified Dodge Ram 1500s), were used to deploy probes. Justin Walker (navigator-meteorologist), and his wife Hannah (driver) rode in PROBE 1, while Danny Cheresnick (navigator) and Aaron Rupert (driver) manned the original Scout vehicle.  Beginning this season, the series also followed Reed Timmer and the crew from the website TornadoVideos.net (TVN). The TVN vehicle is a 2008 Chevrolet Tahoe

Due to popular demand, the Storm Chasers series was aired in the UK starting on February 17, 2009. The Science of Storm Chasing series never came to the UK.

Season 3 (2009)
On May 18, 2009, Discovery Channel renewed Storm Chasers for a third season which began airing in the Fall of 2009. Reed Timmer and the TVN team return with their new "SRV Dominator" vehicle.  Dr. Josh Wurman and his DOW team have now joined the massive, government-funded VORTEX2 research project, leaving them with little time to aid filmmaker Sean Casey. Casey and his TIV team return in their improved TIV2, and are now assisted by a new team of meteorologists in TIV Doghouse (a Dodge Ram 2500 equipped with weather radar, GPS and HD filming equipment). A new team known as TWISTEX led by veteran storm chaser Tim Samaras along with Carl Young and Tony Laubach join the series driving TWISTEX Probe (a modified 2003 GMC Sierra Denali) and Twistex M1-M3 (three modified Chevy Cobalts). Also returning are Danny Cheresnick and Aaron Ruppert in their SCOUT vehicle (a new 2009 Jeep Wrangler replaces the old Nissan Pathfinder).

Timmer's new SRV Dominator is heavily modified version of the Chevy Tahoe used in the previous season. The vehicle now features thin armor shell composed of sheet metal and lexan, giving it an appearance similar to Sean Casey's TIV1. While the new armor allows Timmer and his team to get much closer to a tornado than a conventional vehicle, it cannot actually drive into one like the heavier TIV vehicles. Other additions to Timmer's team include a new advanced radar and an experimental remote controlled aircraft with a 12-foot wingspan, designed to fly around tornadoes with an advanced auto-pilot system, and drop small probes into tornadoes.

The first episode starts with the TVN crew explaining their new vehicle the "SRV Dominator" which is a heavy modified Chevy Tahoe, made like the TIV, but not heavy or strong enough to actually drive into a tornado. While TVN was on their first chase they were able to get close to and record an EF-1 tornado in Oklahoma. Meanwhile, Sean explained his new chase crew does not feature anybody from last season other than the TIV crew. While on their first chase, Sean's team gets lost and misses the first tornado of the season.

The Vortex 2 team (Josh Wurman and the DOW, the Walkers, and  the others) did not appear until the 3rd episode, and do not appear again until the 7th episode. The scout team only appeared in the 4th episode.

Season 4 (2010)
The fourth season of Storm Chasers premiered Wednesday, October 13, 2010, at 10PM Eastern and documents teams of storm chasers during the spring and summer of 2010. This season continues to feature the three groups from the previous season: The TVN team is led by Reed Timmer and rejoined by driver Joel Taylor, who had temporarily left the team the previous year.  IMAX filmmaker Sean Casey returns seeking better tornado footage, this time employing a second-unit IMAX crew to film TIV2 itself. The TWISTEX team led by veteran storm chaser Tim Samaras also returns with a new "TWISTEX Probe" vehicle (a 2008 GMC Sierra HD with extensive weather instrumentation). One of the major events early in the season is the TVN crew's encounter with the aftermath of the April 2010 tornado outbreak in Yazoo City, Mississippi. This was the last season to feature TIV2 Navigator Matt Hughes who died May 26, 2010. Matt's last chase is in the show "Dedication" which is dedicated to Matt Hughes.  Dr. Josh Wurman and his DOW team continues working as part of the massive, 2 year government-funded VORTEX2.

Special
Following the end of season 4, Discovery aired an hour-long, behind-the-scenes special.

Tornado Rampage 2011
A one-hour Discovery Channel special documenting the 2011 Super Outbreak which struck the Southeastern United States.  Episode focused on video captured by Reed Timmer as well as the videos and experiences from non-storm chasers who survived the tornadoes.

Season 5 (2011)
The fifth season of Storm Chasers premiered Sunday, September 25, 2011, at 10PM Eastern and documents teams of storm chasers during the spring and summer of 2011.

References

External links
Discovery Channel's Episode Guide

Lists of American non-fiction television series episodes